Edward Nicholas Slater (born 1 August 1988) is a former English rugby union player who played at lock.

Following a diagnosis of motor neurone disease in July 2022, Slater retired from professional rugby.

Club career

Junior career
Born in Leicester Slater began his rugby career at Milton Keynes RUFC before moving to Australia. He established himself at Eastern Suburbs RUFC, Sydney, NSW. It was here that he began to really improve, starting in a successful U21s side and resulting in playing 1st grade rugby for 'The Beasties'. He also enjoyed a short stint with the NSW Waratahs, where he was signed on a Junior contract. After a short trial with Leicester Tigers he joined Nottingham at the opening stages of the playoff campaign. Here he played alongside future Tigers teammate Tom Youngs. His performances in the Championship playoffs and for the Tigers' development side earned him a move to his hometown club, Leicester Tigers in the summer of 2010.

Leicester Tigers
In 2009/10 Slater provided cover for long-term injuries to England international locks Louis Deacon and Geoff Parling, whilst the retirements of Ben Kay and Richard Blaze allowed Slater to break through to the first team squad. Slater's consistent performances earned him Tigers' Player of the Month award in October 2010 and he went on to make over 30 appearances for the club in his first season. In the same season he helped Tigers top the leaderboard and make it to the Aviva Premiership final in the 2010-2011 season. 
A successful 2012/2013 campaign culminated in a Premiership winners medal for Slater, he was a used replacement in the final. Slater captained the Tigers in the 14/15 (although injured for the majority of the season, he returned to captain the side for the last 10 games) and 15/16 seasons.

Gloucester
On 7 August 2017, Slater left Leicester to sign for Gloucester Rugby as part of a swap deal with Jonny May joining Leicester Tigers from the 2017-18 season. On 21st July 2022, Slater confirmed he was diagnosed with ALS (motor neurone disease) and retired immediately.

International career
Slater was selected in the England Saxons squad in 2012.
He was selected in the senior England Squad in 2012/13, but unfortunately an injury sustained in the Aviva Premiership final ruled him out of the tour shortly after being selected. He was then selected for both the 2014 Six Nations and the summer tour to New Zealand, where he captained England against the Canterbury Crusaders in his first appearance for the senior England side.
Slater was included in Stuart Lancaster's World Cup 51 man training squad. 
He also featured in Eddie Jones' plans at the beginning of 2016, but was injured again (knee).

Personal life and health 
Slater announced that he had been diagnosed with motor neurone disease in July 2022. He retired from professional rugby with immediate effect.

References

External links
 Leicester profile

1988 births
Living people
English rugby union players
Gloucester Rugby players
Leicester Tigers players
Nottingham R.F.C. players
Rugby union flankers
Rugby union locks
Rugby union players from Leicester
People with motor neuron disease